Fairview is a city in Major County, Oklahoma, United States. Its population was 2,579 at the 2010 census. It is the county seat of Major County.

History
The first permanent settlers arrived in the area of the present town at the time of the Cherokee Outlet land opening on September 16, 1893. The town received its name from Adam Bower, an early settler, because of its scenic location along the Cimarron River. The Bower family built a wooden building in which they opened a post office on April 18, 1894. One of Adam's sons, Clifford, served as the first postmaster.

The Kansas City, Mexico and Orient Railway (later part of the Atchison, Topeka and Santa Fe Railroad), built a track through Fairview. The first train arrived 
on August 20, 1903. The railroad soon established machine shops, a roundhouse, and a division office in the town.

The town site was originally within territorial Woods County, but became part of Major County upon its creation at statehood. It was designated as the county seat of Major County, which became permanent after an election December 22, 1908. It beat three competing communities that vied for the title: Cleo Springs, Orienta, and Ringwood. Fairview had 887 residents at statehood, increasing to 2,020 in 1910.

Geography

Demographics

As of the census of 2000,  2,733 people, 1,131 households, and 762 families were residing in the city. The population density was 390.9 people per square mile (151.0/km2). The 1,308 housing units averaged 187.1 per square mile (72.2/km2). The racial makeup of the city was 96.74% White, 0.07% African American, 1.24% Native American, 0.11% Asian, 0.26% from other races, and 1.57% from two or more races. Hispanics or Latinos of any race were 1.46% of the population.

Of the 1,131 households,  30.8% had children under 18 living with them, 55.5% were married couples living together, 8.9% had a female householder with no husband present, and 32.6% were not families. About 30.3% of all households were made up of individuals, and 16.4% had someone living alone who was 65 or older. The average household size was 2.31, and the average family size was 2.86.

In the city, the age distribution was  24.1% under 18, 6.9% from 18 to 24, 23.9% from 25 to 44, 22.6% from 45 to 64, and 22.5% who were 65 or older. The median age was 42 years. For every 100 females, there were 86.9 males. For every 100 females age 18 and over, there were 80.3 males.

The median income for a household in the city was $30,136, and for a family was $37,107. Males had a median income of $31,141 versus $17,279 for females. The per capita income for the city was $19,101. About 8.5% of families and 10.9% of the population were below the poverty line, including 16.5% of those under age 18 and 6.4% of those age 65 or over.

Education
Fairview currently has the Fairview Public School system. Fairview has one elementary school that provides prekindergarten through grade five, Cornelson Elementary School; one middle school/junior high that provides grades six through eight, Chamberlin Middle School; and one high school that provides grades 9 through 12, Fairview High School. In addition,  Head Start preschool and a pre-K program, and vocational education, are through the Northwest Technology Center. The mascot for Fairview public schools is the Fighting Yellowjacket (Jackets) with school colors of orange and black.

Notable people
 Shirley "S. L." Abbott, Texas legislator and U.S. ambassador
 Clinton Riggs (1910-1997), former assistant police chief of Tulsa
 Walter Bartel (1926-2019), co-founder of Waldon, Inc.

References

External links
 City Of Fairview
 Encyclopedia of Oklahoma History and Culture - Fairview
 Oklahoma Digital Maps: Digital Collections of Oklahoma and Indian Territory

Cities in Oklahoma
Cities in Major County, Oklahoma
County seats in Oklahoma